Durene, or 1,2,4,5-tetramethylbenzene, is an organic compound with the formula C6H2(CH3)4.  It is a colourless solid with a sweet odor.  The compound is classified as an alkylbenzene.  It is one of three isomers of  tetramethylbenzene, the other two being prehnitene (1,2,3,4-tetramethylbenzene) and isodurene (1,2,3,5-tetramethylbenzene).  Durene has an unusually high melting point (79.2 °C), reflecting its high molecular symmetry.

Production
It is a component of coal tar and was first prepared from pseudocumene in 1870.  It is produced by methylation of other methylated benzene compounds such as p-xylene and pseudocumene.
C6H4(CH3)2 + 2 CH3Cl → C6H2(CH3)4 + 2 HCl
In industry, a mixture of xylenes and trimethylbenzenes is alkylated with methanol.  Durene can be separated from its isomers by selective crystallization, exploiting its high melting point.  The original synthesis of durene involved a similar reaction starting from toluene.

Durene is a significant byproduct of the production of gasoline from methanol via the "MTG (Methanol to Gasoline) process".

Reactions and uses
It is a relatively easily oxidized benzene derivative, with E1/2 of 2.03 V vs NHE. Its nucleophilicity is comparable to that of phenol.  It is readily halogenated on the ring for example.  Nitration gives the dinitro derivative, a precursor to duroquinone.  In industry, it is the precursor to pyromellitic dianhydride, which is used for manufacturing curing agents, adhesives, coating materials. It is used in the manufacture of some raw materials for engineering plastics (polyimides) and cross-linking agent for alkyd resins. It is also a suitable starting material for the synthesis of hexamethylbenzene.

With a simple proton NMR spectrum comprising two signals due to the 2 aromatic hydrogens (2H) and four methyl groups (12H), durene is used as an internal standard.

Safety

Durene is not a skin irritant nor a skin sensitizer or eye irritant. Durene is only slightly toxic on an acute toxicologic basis and only poses an acute health hazard when ingested in excessive quantities.

References

Hydrocarbon solvents
Alkylbenzenes
C4-Benzenes